The Zachary-Tolbert House, also known as the Mordecai Zachary House, is a restored pre-American Civil War house located at Cashiers, Jackson County, North Carolina. The house was built between 1850 and 1852, and is a two-story, five bay Greek Revival style frame dwelling. It has a low hipped roof and central front, two-story, portico.  A frame two-room kitchen was added to the rear elevation and was connected to the house by a covered breezeway in the 1920s.

It was listed on the National Register of Historic Places in December 1998.

The house is owned by the Cashiers Historical Society and operated as a historic house museum that features a collection of hand-crafted ‘plain-style’ furniture.

See also
 National Register of Historic Places listings in Jackson County, North Carolina

References

External links
 Zachary-Tolbert House - Cashiers Historical Society

Houses on the National Register of Historic Places in North Carolina
Greek Revival houses in North Carolina
Houses completed in 1850
Houses in Jackson County, North Carolina
Museums in Jackson County, North Carolina
Historic house museums in North Carolina
National Register of Historic Places in Jackson County, North Carolina